Westfall Winery was a winery in Montague Township in Sussex County, New Jersey. Formerly a stop on the Underground Railroad and a dairy farm, the vineyard was first planted in 2000, and opened to the public in 2003. Westfall had 6 acres of grapes under cultivation, and produced 9,000 cases of wine per year, mostly from imported grapes. The winery was named for the family that owned the farm from 1774 to 1940. It was sold in December 2017 and became an animal sanctuary.

Wines
Westfall Winery produced grape wine and also made fruit wines from apples, blackberries, blueberries, cranberries, and peaches.

Other features and properties
When operating as a winery, the farm also offered equestrian services, including horse boarding, and specializes in the use of Morgan horses. In 2006, the owners of Westfall founded Island Winery in Hilton Head, South Carolina.

See also 
List of wineries, breweries, and distilleries in New Jersey
New Jersey Farm Winery Act
New Jersey Wine Industry Advisory Council
New Jersey wine

References

External links 
Garden State Wine Growers Association
Vintage North Jersey

Tourist attractions in Sussex County, New Jersey
2003 establishments in New Jersey
Montague Township, New Jersey